HC Steelers Kapfenberg was a professional ice hockey team from Kapfenberg, Austria. The team played its first season in the Inter-National League in the 2014–15 season. The team was established in 2014 as a new ice hockey organisation in Kapfenberg.

References

External links
Eliteprospects profile
Eurohockey profile

Ice hockey teams in Austria
Inter-National League teams
Ice hockey clubs established in 2014
Ice hockey clubs disestablished in 2015